Donald "Dusty" Wakeman is an American rock/country music producer and engineer based in Burbank, California.  Wakeman is also credited as a bass player on many recordings.  Dusty has worked with Dwight Yoakam, Lucinda Williams, Jim Lauderdale, Buck Owens, Michelle Shocked, Tom Russell, Roger Clyne and the Peacemakers, Anne McCue, Tony Furtado, Feel, Reacharound, Dieselhed among others. He served as musical director for Gram Parsons: Return to Sin City and for the Sin City All Stars. He is also the owner of Mad Dog Studios, which is now a home studio, and president of Mojave Audio.

He is married to Szu Wang, with two kids, JD Wakeman and Sunny Wakeman.

References

P = Producer

E = Engineer

M = Mixer

B = Bassist

MD = Musical Director

2006 - present President of Mojave Audio, Inc.

MERLE HAGGARD TRIBUTE: Outlaw Country West Cruise  MD B

FREEDY JOHNSTON: 40 Below Records  Back On The Road To You  B

FREEDY JOHNSON: Singing Magnet Records Neon Repairman B

BILLY RAY CYRUS: Blue Cadillac Change My Mind B

ANNE McCUE: Messenger Koala Motel PEMB

BOBBY JOYNER: Papago Skies of Blue, Fields of Green PEMB

TONY FURTADO: Funzalo 13 B

GRAM PARSONS TRIBUTE Return to Sin City - the Concerts MD, B

GRAM PARSONS TRIBUTE Return to Sin City - the DVD M

ANNE McCUE: Messenger Roll PEMB

ROGER CLYNE & the PEACEMAKERS:EmmaJava Americano! PEM

TONY FURTADO: Funzalo The Good Stuff PEMB

SAWTOOTH: Sin City Lords of the High Desert PEMB

SIN CITY ALL STARS: Sin City Sweathogs of the Rodeo PEMB

FEEL: Curb Feel PEM

TONY FURTADO: Dualtone Live M

MINIBAR: Foodchain Fly Below The Radar PEM

JONNY KAPLAN: Ripe Ride Free PEM

RIAN GREENE: Shakedown See Things Like You PEMB

JEFF PRYOR BAND:Teze Loverland EM

RHETT FRAZIER: Mad Dog WelcomeTo The Club(LP PEMB

ROD STEWART: Boulevard “It Had To Be You” E

ME’SHELL NDEGEOCELLO:Maverick Bitter(LP) E

BACHELOR NUMBER ONE:Universal “Summertime” American Pie Soundtrack PEM

DWIGHT YOAKAM: Warner Bros Long Way Home (LP) E

BILLY TULSA & THE PSCHO CRAWDADS Tennessee Rain (LP) PEM

DIESELHED:Amarillo Shallow Water Blackout (LP PEM

ROB ZOMBIE:Album Network More Human Than Human- Live Radio E

LONESOME STRANGERS: Little Dog/Mercury Land Of Opportunity (LP) PEMB

DWIGHT YOAKAM: Warner Bros. Come On Christmas (LP) APE

JOY LYNN WHITE: Little Dog/Mercury The Lucky Few (LP) PE

DWIGHT YOAKAM: Warner Bros. Under The Covers (LP) APE

*Grammy Nominee: Best Country Album

REACHAROUND: Carport/Trauma/Interscope Who Is Tommy Cooper? (LP PE

SCOTT JOSS: Little Dog/Mercuy Souvenirs (LP) PEB

DIRK HAMILTON: Acoustic Rock Records sufferupachuckle (LP) PEM

SARA EVANS: RCA Three Chords And The Truth (LP E

JIM LAUDERDALE: Atlantic Every Second Counts (LP) PEMB

DWIGHT YOAKAM: Warner Bros. Gone (LP) APE

BUCK OWENS The Reunion Concert with Merle Haggard EM

JIM MATT: Little Dog/ Mercury A Better Place To Live PEB

PETE ANDERSON: Little Dog/Mercury Working Class (LP) PEB

HEATHER MYLES: HighTone Untamed (LP) M

JIM LAUDERDALE: Atlantic Pretty Close To The Truth (LP) PEMB

DANNY TATE: Virgin Nobody’s Perfect (LP) APEB

LA GUARDIA: Serdisco (Spain) Accento Del Sur (LP) PEM

“CHASERS”: Morgan Creek Films, Film Score EB

DWIGHT YOAKAM: Warner Bros. This Time* (LP) APE

*Multi-Platinum Sales

*Grammy Winner - Best Male Vocal Performance

TOM RUSSELL: Philo/Sony Plains Box of Visions (LP) PEMB

LA GUARDIA: Serdisco (Spain) Contra Reloj (LP) PEM

ANTHONY CRAWFORD: Little Dog Anthony Crawford (LP) PEB

SOMEBODY’S DARLING: Sonet/Polygram Somebody’s Darling* (LP PE

*Platinum Sales - Norway *Platinum Sales - Norway

ROSIE FLORES: High Tone Once More With Feeling (LP) PEMB

LUCINDA WILLIAMS: Chameleon Sweet Old World (LP PEM

ROSIE FLORES: HighTone After The Farm (LP) PEMB

HEATHER MYLES: HighTone Just Like Old Times (LP) M

WYNTON MARSALIS: Delilah Films A Tribute To Louis Armstrong M

DWIGHT YOAKAM: Warner/WEA La Croix D’Amour (LP) APE

BONEDADDYS: Bonedoggie Jungle/Jungle (LP) PEM

STEVE FORBERT: Geffen The American In Me (LP) EB

LA GUARDIA: Serdisco (Spain) Al Otro Lado (LP) PEM

MEAT PUPPETS: London Forbidden Places (LP) E

STEVE PRYOR BAND: Zoo Steve Pryor Band (LP) E

GIANT SAND: Atlantic “Shadow To You”+"Romance of Falling" PEM

VARIOUS ARTISTS: HighTone L.A. Ya Ya (LP) PEM

MARTIN STEPHENSON Salutation Road (LP) EM

& THE DAINTIES: London

DARDEN SMITH: CBS Trouble No More (LP) E

DWIGHT YOAKAM: Warner Bros. If There Was A Way* (LP) E

*Multi-Platinum Sales

. “DADDY’S DYING”: Propaganda Films Film Score EB

TOMMY CONWELL Guitar Trouble (LP) E

& THE YOUNG RAMBLERS: CBS

LOS LOBOS: ARISTA Compilation Deadicated: “Bertha” EM

DWIGHT YOAKAM: ARISTA Compilation Deadicated: “Truckin’” E

JACKSON BROWNE: Elektra Compilation Ruby’At: “First Girl I Loved” E

CHRIS SPEDDING: New Rose Cafe Days (LP) M

MICHELLE SHOCKED: Polygram Captain Swing (LP B

TISH HINOJOSA: A&M Homeland (LP) M

LONESOME STRANGERS: High Tone The Lonesome Strangers (LP) M

NEVILLE BROTHERS: Cinemax Sessions Tell It Like It Is M

JIM LAUDERDALE: CBS Point of No Return (LP EMB

BUCK OWENS: Capitol Hot Dog (LP) EMB

DWIGHT YOAKAM: Warner Bros. Buenas Nochas From A Lonely Room EM

*Multi-Platinum Sales

LUCINDA WILLIAMS: Rough Trade Lucinda Williams (LP) PEM

BONEDADDYS: Chameleon A-Koo-De-A (LP) PEM

ROSIE FLORES: Warner Bros. Rosie Flores (LP) EM

DWIGHT YOAKAM: Warner Bros. Hillbilly Deluxe* (LP) EM

*Multi-Platinum Sales

VARIOUS ARTISTS: Enigma A Town South ofBakersfield vol. 2 (LP EB

ROY ORBISON & k.d. Lang “Crying”* E

*Grammy Winner - Best Country Vocal Collaboration

LONESOME STRANGERS: Wrestler Lonesome Pine (LP) EM

DWIGHT YOAKAM: Warner Bros. Guitars, Cadillacs, Etc., Etc.* (LP) EM

*Multi-Platinum Sales

VARIOUS ARTISTS: Enigma A Town South of Bakersfield vol. 1 (LP) EM

Living people
Musicians from Burbank, California
Year of birth missing (living people)